James Roberts (born 11 April 1991) is an Australian swimmer. He is a two-time medalist at the World Championships (one gold, one silver), and represented Australia at the 2012 Summer Olympics.

Career
At the 2011 Australian Swimming Championships, Roberts qualified for the national team by placing second behind James Magnussen in the 100-metre freestyle in a time of 48.72 seconds.  At the 2011 World Aquatics Championships, Roberts won a total of two medals, one gold and one silver.  Roberts earned both of his medals by swimming in the heats of the 4×100-metre freestyle and medley relay. In the 100-meter freestyle, Roberts did not advance past the semifinals, and finished 10th overall with a time of 48.49.

At the 2012 Australian Swimming Championships, which also served as Australia's Olympic trials, Roberts qualified for the 2012 Summer Olympics by placing second in the 100-metre freestyle.  In the 100-metre freestyle final, Roberts recorded a personal best of 47.63 seconds, finishing behind James Magnussen who won in 47.10. In the 50-meter freestyle final, Roberts placed 4th in 22.31.

In his first event at the 2012 Summer Olympics in London, the 4×100-metre freestyle relay, Roberts swam the anchor leg in a time of 48.09.  The Australian team, although the favorites, failed to medal and placed fourth in the final with a time of 3:11.63.  Roberts also swam in the heats of the 4×100-metre freestyle relay and recorded a time of 48.22 as the second leg.  After recording a time of 48.93 in the heats of the 100-metre freestyle, Roberts failed to advance to the final, posting a time of 48.57 in the semifinals.  As a result of illness, Roberts was left off the 4×100-metre medley relay in the heats.

Personal bests
.

References

External links
 
 
 
 
 
 
 
 

1991 births
Living people
Australian male freestyle swimmers
World Aquatics Championships medalists in swimming
Olympic swimmers of Australia
Olympic bronze medalists for Australia
Olympic bronze medalists in swimming
Swimmers at the 2012 Summer Olympics
Swimmers at the 2016 Summer Olympics
Medalists at the 2016 Summer Olympics
Commonwealth Games medallists in swimming
Commonwealth Games gold medallists for Australia
Swimmers at the 2018 Commonwealth Games
People from Tweed Heads, New South Wales
Sportsmen from New South Wales
21st-century Australian people
Medallists at the 2018 Commonwealth Games